Arugas Habosem may refer to:

Arugas Habosem, a book of responsa by Rabbi Moshe Greenwald, the Chuster Rav
Arugas Habosem, a commentary on piyyutim by Rabbi Avraham ben Azriel, circa 1230
Congregation Arugas Habosem, Baltimore
Congregation Arugas Habosem, Williamsburg